On August 11, 2006, an oil spill occurred in Panay Gulf when the oil tanker, MT Solar 1, sank off the coasts of Guimaras and Negros in the Philippines, causing what is considered to be the worst oil spill in the country's history.

Background

The oil spill adversely affected marine sanctuaries and mangrove reserves in three out of five municipalities in Guimaras Island and reached the shores of Iloilo and Negros Occidental. The oil spill occurred in the Guimaras Strait that connects the Visayan Sea with the Sulu Sea, and is considered a rich fishing ground that supplies most of the demand for the entire country. (NDCC, August 2006)

Haribon sent two biologists to Guimaras to assess the damage and talk to the affected communities regarding their immediate needs. Haribon provided assistance particularly for the long-term rehabilitation of the area. The government evacuated the affected families who had been exposed to the toxic elements of the crude oil. According to reports gathered in the field, people contracted skin diseases associated with these elements.

Causes
Several causes have been cited, including bad weather and human error. Allegations have been made stating that the tanker only had a capacity of 1.2 million liters, implying the possibility of overloading.  Other investigations have claimed that the ship's Captain was not qualified to sail the vessel.

Effects

The spill damaged Taklong Island National Marine Reserve, a marine sanctuary for feeding and breeding ground for fish and other species.  The oil slick also posed a threat to the blue crab industry in the municipality of Enrique B. Magalona in Negros Occidental.

Dr. Jose Ingles, eco-region coordinator of the World Wide Fund for Nature in the Philippines, Indonesia and Malaysia, said that the damage may be felt by at least two generations. He warned that the disaster may have damaged the reefs and mangroves, scarring the ecosystem and causing seafood yields to significantly decrease. According to him, the worst hit would be the shorelines, the coasts and the swamplands with mangroves. This will greatly impact the livelihood of the fishermen, mostly living in poor conditions.

In the south-southeast of the spill site is located the Sulu Sea, a deep-water area frequented by commercially valued fish such as blue marlin and the yellowfin tuna, prized by the towns of southern Negros Occidental province as an important source of income for the communities. The oil slick may damage this thriving local industry.

On August 22, 2006, the Philippine Coast Guard stated that the spill has affected 20 communities in 4 municipalities in Guimaras. It also threatened 27 communities in Iloilo province and 17 others in Negros Occidental.

Casualties
A villager from Barangay Lapaz, Nueva Valencia, Guimaras, became the first casualty directly affected by the spill. He died after inhaling the fumes of the oil sludge caused him to contract cardio-respiratory disease. Two sailors from the ship were also reported missing.

Response
Due to the extent of the disaster, the cleanup was expected to reach three years.

Local response

On August 19, the Philippine government has asked the governments of Indonesia, Japan and the United States to help assist with the cleanup.

President Gloria Macapagal Arroyo created Task Force Guimaras on August 22 in order to oversee both the cleanup of the oil spill and the retrieval of the 1.5 million liters of fuel oil still remaining inside the tanker. The government also ordered the creation of the Special Board of Marine Inquiry to determine who and what caused the spill.

Guimaras Governor JC Rahman Nava has objected to the proposal of disposing the oil wastes within the province.

Clemente Cancio, President of Sunshine Maritime Development Corporation (SMDC), the company which owned MT Solar I, said that their foreign insurer was willing to pay the cost of damage brought about by the oil spill.

President Gloria Arroyo ordered a full investigation into the country's worst oil spill that devastated marine ecosystems in the central Philippines. "We shall do everything in our power to right the wrongs caused by this unfortunate incident," Arroyo said after visiting the island, adding that she was deeply pained by the disaster that she declared a "national calamity".

International response
On August 17, British oil experts, sent by SMDC's foreign insurer, arrived in Guimaras to assess the situation. SMDC stated that the experts will check the extent of the oil pollution. The Britons conducted an aerial survey over Guimaras Island and made recommendations based on their findings.

A four-man team from the U.S. Coast Guard arrived on August 23 to assist in determining the exact location of the tanker.

Thirteen Years after the Guimaras Oil spill

In October 2019, Mongabay presented how Guimaras was able to rise above the worst oil spill in the Philippines. It was with the help from the local community members, the local government unit, and the international responders.

See also 
 List of maritime disasters in the Philippines
 Oriental Mindoro oil spill

References

Maritime incidents in the Philippines
History of Guimaras
Visayan history
Oil spills in Asia
Shipwrecks in the Pacific Ocean
Maritime incidents in 2006
2006 disasters in the Philippines
2006 industrial disasters
2006 in the environment
August 2006 events in the Philippines